Lyubomir Miletich (14 January 1863 – 1 June 1937) was a leading Bulgarian linguist, ethnographer, dialectologist and historian, as well as the chairman of the Bulgarian Academy of Sciences from 1926 to his death.

Biography 
Lyubomir Miletich was born in Štip, today in North Macedonia, to a Bulgarian family originally from Edirne (Odrin) in modern Eastern Thrace, Turkey. His great-grandfather voivode Mile had left Edirne and settled in the Austrian Banat in the early 19th century, where Lyubomir's grandfather Simo was born. Simo had two sons, Svetozar and Đorđe, Lyubomir's father, who, after briefly living in Bosnia and North Africa, returned to his homeland to become a teacher in Macedonia and northwestern Bulgaria in 1859. Miletich's mother, Evka Popdaova, was born in Veles, Macedonia.

Miletich studied in Sofia and Novi Sad, but finished school in the Zagreb Secondary School for Classical Education in 1882 and graduated in Slavistics from the University of Zagreb and Charles University in Prague, where he was taught by Jan Gebauer. Miletich participated in the foundation of Sofia University in 1888. He became a Ph.D. of philology and Slavic philology of the University of Zagreb in July 1889. Miletich become the dean of the Faculty of History and Philology of University of Sofia during the 1903–04 academic year. During the 1900–01 and 1921–22, he was the rector of the University.

Since 1898, Miletich was a member of the Bulgarian Academy of Sciences, which it presided from 1926 until his death. Similarly, he was the chairman of the Bulgarian Macedonian Scientific Institute from 1927 to his death.

Miletich was a doctor honoris causa of the Kharkiv University, a corresponding member of the Russian Academy of Sciences, as well of the Russian Historical Society, the Polish Academy of Learning, the South Slavic Academy of Sciences, the Czech Academy of Sciences, the Czech Scientific Society and the Czech Ethnographic Society, the Hungarian Ethnographic Society and the Russian Archaeological Institute.

Miletich died in Sofia on 1 June 1937.

Honours
Miletich Point on Greenwich Island in the South Shetland Islands, Antarctica is named after Lyubomir Miletich.

See also
 The Destruction of Thracian Bulgarians in 1913

References

External links

 
  
 Любомир Милетич. Ловчанските помаци, 1899, с.12 (Lyubomir Miletich. Lovech Pomaks, 1899, p. 12). In: bg.scribd.com/doc/50486983/).
 Series of memoirs, published by the Macedonian Scientific Institute in Sofia during the interwar period in several volumes: Slaveiko Arsov, Pando Klyashev, Ivan Popov, Smile Voidanov, Deyan Dimitrov, Nikola Mitrev, Luka Dzherov, Georgi Pop Hristov, Angel Andreev, Georgi Papanchev, Lazar Dimitrov, Damyan Gruev, Boris Sarafov, Ivan Garvanov, Pavel Shatev, Yane Sandanski, Chernyo Peev, Sava Mihailov, Hristo Kuslev, Ivan Anastasov Gyrcheto, Petyr Hr. Yurukov, Nikola Pushkarov, Gyorcho Petrov, Mihail Gerdzhikov, Ivan Tatarchev, Alekso Stefanov. 

20th-century Bulgarian historians
Bulgarian philologists
19th-century Bulgarian historians
Linguists from Bulgaria
Bulgarian ethnographers
People from Štip
Members of the Macedonian Scientific Institute
Members of the Bulgarian Academy of Sciences
Corresponding members of the Saint Petersburg Academy of Sciences
Corresponding Members of the Russian Academy of Sciences (1917–1925)
University of Novi Sad alumni
1937 deaths
Charles University alumni
1863 births
Burials at Central Sofia Cemetery
Academic staff of Sofia University
Macedonian Bulgarians
Rectors of Sofia University